The 2001 Holy Cross Crusaders football team was an American football team that represented the College of the Holy Cross during the 2001 NCAA Division I-AA football season. Holy Cross finished fifth in the Patriot League.

In their sixth year under head coach Dan Allen, the Crusaders compiled a 4–6 record. Brian Hall, James Jenkins and Vernell Shaw were the team captains.

The Crusaders outscored opponents 247 to 179. Holy Cross' 3–4 conference record placed fifth out of eight in the Patriot League standings. 

Like most of the Patriot League, Holy Cross played just 10 of its 11 scheduled games, after its September 15 matchup, against Ivy League opponent Harvard, was canceled following the September 11 attacks. It was the first year in more than two decades without a Crimson-Crusader football game, and the only year between 1981 and 2015 without the intrastate matchup.

Holy Cross played its home games at Fitton Field on the college campus in Worcester, Massachusetts.

Schedule

References

Holy Cross
Holy Cross Crusaders football seasons
Holy Cross Crusaders football